Catocala robinsonii, or Robinson's underwing, is a moth of the family Erebidae. The species was first described by Augustus Radcliffe Grote in 1872. It is found in North America from southern Ontario and New Hampshire south to Florida west to Oklahoma, Missouri and Arkansas and northward to Illinois, Indiana, and Michigan (where it is rare).

The wingspan is 70–80 mm. Adults are on wing from July to October depending on the location. There is probably one generation per year.

The larvae feed on Carya ovata, Juglans and Quercus alba.

References

External links
Oehlke, Bill. "Catocala robinsoni Grote, 1872". The Catocala Website. Archived August 20, 2008.

robinsonii
Moths described in 1872
Moths of North America